Faleapuna is a village on the island of Upolu in Samoa. It is situated on the north east coast of the island in the political district of Va'a-o-Fonoti. The village is an exclave of Va'a-o-Fonoti and is geographically located further west within the district of Atua, and forms part of the Anoamaa 1 Electoral Constituency (Faipule District) which forms part of the larger A'ana political district. 

The population is 600.

References

Populated places in Va'a-o-Fonoti